Nutuk (known as A Speech or The Speech in English) was a speech delivered by Ghazi Mustafa Kemal from 15 to 20 October 1927, at the second congress of Republican People's Party. The speech covered the events between the start of the Turkish War of Independence on 19 May 1919, and the foundation of the Republic of Turkey, in 1923. It took thirty-six hours (on a 6 day span) to be read by Atatürk, and became a foundation of Kemalist historiography. Nutuk marked a turning point of Turkish nationalism by introducing a series of new myths and concepts into the vernacular of public discourse, such as republic, democracy, sovereignty of the nation, and secularism. Atatürk designated these concepts as the 'most precious treasures' of Turkish people, the 'foundations' of their new state, and the preconditions of their future 'existence' in his speech.

Context
Mustafa Kemal begins his speech by describing the situation of the Ottoman Empire when he landed at Samsun to start the Turkish War of Independence in 1919: 

He argues that the Ottoman Empire is on its death throes by 1919. The people and the army keep loyal to the Sultan who was guilty of treachery, due to centuries old traditions and dogmas: 

He asserts that Turkey can only be respected by other powers if it achieves independence: 

Criticizing certain predominant ideas among the Ottoman populace regarding the continued existence of the Ottoman state, particularly about favoring being either an American or British protectorate, he explains his rejection to such ideas and puts forward his reasoning for the founding of a Turkish state: 
Atatürk ended the speech by conveying his message to Turkish youth.

Analysis
According to Turkish historian Hakan Uzun, Nutuk is an embodiment of the core values of the nation that Atatürk has embraced. The speech covers the importance of national unity to both the National Movement and the republic. The National Movement, with the goal of achieving independence and unity through the pursue of sovereignty, has done so with a defensive position rather than an aggressive one via a lawful foundation.

According to Turkish sociologist Fatma Müge Göçek, the speech was "adopted as the official Turkish national narrative and became sacralized by the state". Göçek stated that, because the law criminalizes insulting Atatürk, Turkish historians have been unable to analyze the speech critically. She said: "It is evident that the text commences the birth of the Turkish nation with 1919, removing in the process the demise of the Armenians in 1915 through state violence to the realm of Republican prehistory."

Historian Marc David Baer wrote: British Historian Perry Anderson states that, "The speech he gave in 1927 that became the official creed of the nation dwarfed any address by Khrushchev or Castro. Extolling his own achievements, it went on for 36 hours, delivered over six days, eventually composing a tome of 600 pages: a record in the annals of autocracy."

References

Further reading

External links 
 Complete text in Ottoman Turkish
 Complete text in modern Turkish
 Ataturk Research Center, Ankara, Turkey
 Atatürk Society of Canada translation

Speeches by heads of state
Mustafa Kemal Atatürk
1927 in Turkey
Grand National Assembly of Turkey
1927 speeches